The Genesis New York is a concept car made by Hyundai Motor Company for its luxury division, Genesis Motor. It debuted at the 2016 New York International Auto Show with a hybrid gasoline-electric drivetrain, previewing the Genesis G70 production automobile.

Design
Genesis described the styling as "athletic elegance", with a long hood and performance-oriented silhouette; the exterior design team was led by Luc Donckerwolke.

References

External links

Cars introduced in 2016
Concept cars
New York